The 1909–10 Penn State Nittany Lions men's ice hockey season was the inaugural season of play for the program.

Season
Penn State agreed to form an Intercollegiate League with Carnegie Tech and Pittsburgh. Due to the demise of the WPHL the year before the operators of the Duquesne Gardens agreed not only to host all games between the three teams but to assume all resulting financial obligations. Penn State played its first game against the Tartans on Christmas day 1909. Their second game came a week later but soon thereafter the faculty at State College required the team to leave the League and return to campus.

Penn State would not play another varsity game until 1940.

Roster

Standings

Schedule and Results

|-
!colspan=12 style=";" | Regular Season

References

Penn State Nittany Lions men's ice hockey seasons
Penn State
Penn State
Penn State
Penn State